The Institute of Electrical and Electronics Engineers (IEEE) is a 501(c)(3) professional association for electronics engineering, electrical engineering, and other related disciplines with its corporate office in New York City and its operations center in Piscataway, New Jersey. The mission of the IEEE is advancing technology for the benefit of humanity. The IEEE was formed from the amalgamation of the American Institute of Electrical Engineers and the Institute of Radio Engineers in 1963.

Due to its expansion of scope into so many related fields, it is simply referred to by the letters I-E-E-E (pronounced I-triple-E), except on legal business documents. , it is the world's largest association of technical professionals with more than 423,000 members in over 160 countries around the world. Its objectives are the educational and technical advancement of electrical and electronics engineering, telecommunications, computer engineering, and other similar disciplines.

History

Origins 

The IEEE traces its founding to 1884 and the American Institute of Electrical Engineers. In 1912, the rival Institute of Radio Engineers was formed. Although the AIEE was initially larger, the IRE attracted more students and was larger by the mid-1950s. The AIEE and IRE merged in 1963.

The IEEE headquarters is in New York City at 3 Park Ave, but most business is done at the IEEE Operations Center in Piscataway, NJ, first occupied in 1975.

Growth 
The American Institute of Electrical Engineers (AIEE) and the Institute of Radio Engineers (IRE) merged to create the Institute of Electrical and Electronics Engineers (IEEE) on January 1, 1963. At that time, the combined group had 150,000 members, 93%  in the United States. By 1984 there were 250,000 members, 20% of whom were outside the U.S.

The Australian Section of the IEEE existed between 1972 and 1985. After this date, it split into state- and territory-based sections.

, IEEE has over 400,000 members in 160 countries, with the U.S. based membership no longer constituting a majority.

Controversies

Huawei ban 
In May 2019, IEEE restricted Huawei employees from peer reviewing papers or handling papers as editors due to the "severe legal implications" of U.S. government sanctions against Huawei. As members of its standard-setting body, Huawei employees could continue to exercise their voting rights, attend standards development meetings, submit proposals and comment in public discussions on new standards. The ban sparked outrage among Chinese scientists on social media. Some professors in China decided to cancel their memberships.

On June 3, 2019, IEEE lifted restrictions on Huawei's editorial and peer review activities after receiving clearance from the United States government.

Position on the Russia-Ukraine conflict 
On February 26, 2022, the chair of the IEEE Ukraine Section, Ievgen Pichkalov, publicly appealed to the IEEE members to "freeze [IEEE] activities and membership in Russia" and requested "public reaction and strict disapproval of Russia’s aggression" from the IEEE and IEEE Region 8. On March 17, 2022, an article in the form of Q&A interview with IEEE Russia (Siberia) senior member Roman Gorbunov titled "A Russian Perspective on the War in Ukraine" was published in IEEE Spectrum to demonstrate "the plurality of views among IEEE members" and the "views that are at odds with international reporting on the war in Ukraine". On March 30, 2022, activist Anna Rohrbach created an open letter to the IEEE in an attempt to have them directly address the article, stating that the article used "common narratives in Russian propaganda" on the 2022 Russian invasion of Ukraine and requesting the IEEE Spectrum to acknowledge "that they have unwittingly published a piece furthering misinformation and Russian propaganda." A few days later a note from the editors was added on April 6 with an apology "for not providing adequate context at the time of publication", though the editors did not revise the original article.

Publications

IEEE claims to produce over 30% of the world's literature in the electrical, electronics, and computer engineering fields, publishing approximately 200 peer-reviewed journals and magazines. IEEE publishes more than 1,200 conference proceedings every year.

The published content in these journals as well as the content from several hundred annual conferences sponsored by the IEEE are available in the IEEE Electronic Library (IEL) available through IEEE Xplore platform, for subscription-based access and individual publication purchases.

In addition to journals and conference proceedings, the IEEE also publishes tutorials and standards that are produced by its standardization committees. The organization also has its own IEEE paper format.

Educational activities
The IEEE provides learning opportunities within the engineering sciences, research, and technology.

IEEE offers educational opportunities such as IEEE eLearning Library,  the Education Partners Program,  Standards in Education, and Continuing Education Units (CEUs).

IEEE eLearning Library is a collection of online educational courses designed for self-paced learning. Education Partners, exclusive for IEEE members, offers on-line degree programs, certifications and courses at a 10% discount. The Standards in Education website explains what standards are and the importance of developing and using them. The site includes tutorial modules and case illustrations to introduce the history of standards, the basic terminology, their applications and impact on products, as well as news related to standards, book reviews and links to other sites that contain information on standards. Currently, forty states in the United States require Professional Development Hours (PDH) to maintain a Professional Engineering license, encouraging engineers to seek Continuing Education Units (CEUs) for their participation in continuing education programs. CEUs readily translate into Professional Development Hours (PDHs), with 1 CEU being equivalent to 10 PDHs. Countries outside the United States, such as South Africa, similarly require continuing professional development (CPD) credits, and it is anticipated that IEEE Expert Now courses will feature in the CPD listing for South Africa.

IEEE also sponsors a website designed to help young people better understand engineering. This website allows students to search for accredited engineering degree programs in Canada and the United States.

Through the Student Activities Committee, IEEE facilitates partnership between student activities and all other IEEE entities.

Technical societies
Various technical areas are addressed by IEEE's 39 societies, each one focused on a certain knowledge area. They provide specialized publications, conferences, business networking, and sometimes other services.

IEEE Computer Society
IEEE Computer Society is the largest among IEEE Societies with membership of 51,985 as of 2021. Its flagship publication included as part of the membership is Computer. Non members and members  can sign up for free Computing Edge magazine, which is a digest of content previously  published in several IEEE Computer society magazines.

IEEE Global History Network
In September 2008, the IEEE History Committee founded the IEEE Global History Network, which now redirects to Engineering and Technology History Wiki.

IEEE Foundation
The IEEE Foundation is a charitable foundation established in 1973 to support and promote technology education, innovation, and excellence. It is incorporated separately from the IEEE, although it has a close relationship to it. Members of the Board of Directors of the foundation are required to be active members of IEEE, and one third of them must be current or former members of the IEEE Board of Directors.

Initially, the role of the IEEE Foundation was to accept and administer donations for the IEEE Awards program, but donations increased beyond what was necessary for this purpose, and the scope was broadened. In addition to soliciting and administering unrestricted funds, the foundation also administers donor-designated funds supporting particular educational, humanitarian, historical preservation, and peer recognition programs of the IEEE. As of the end of 2014, the foundation's total assets were nearly $45 million, split equally between unrestricted and donor-designated funds.

See also
 Certified Software Development Professional (CSDP) program of the IEEE Computer Society
 Glossary of electrical and electronics engineering
 Engineering and Technology History Wiki
 Eta Kappa Nu – IEEE HKN Honor society
 IEEE Standards Association
 Institution of Engineering and Technology (UK)
 International Electrotechnical Commission (IEC)
 List of IEEE awards
 List of IEEE conferences
 List of IEEE fellows

References

External links

 
 IEEE Xplore, research database and online digital library archive
 IEEE History Center

Institute of Electrical and Electronics Engineers
1963 establishments in New York (state)
Organizations based in New York City
Piscataway, New Jersey
Professional associations based in the United States
Standards organizations in the United States
501(c)(3) organizations